Jesús Capitán Prada (born 26 March 1977), known as Capi, is a Spanish former footballer who played as an attacking midfielder.

He spent most of his professional career with Betis, which included 209 La Liga games and 16 goals over the course of nine seasons (13 overall).

Club career

Betis
Capi was born in Camas, Seville, Andalusia. Apart from a loan spell at Granada CF in the Segunda División B, he spent the vast majority of his career at Real Betis. He started out with their reserves in the same league, and made his first-team and La Liga debut against Valencia CF on 26 May 1997, one of only two during the season.

Capi went to play over 300 competitive games for the Estadio Benito Villamarín-based club, always as an important part of the squad. He scored his first goal for them on 19 November 2000, albeit in a 1–3 home defeat to neighbouring Sevilla FC where he excelled before being stretchered off with 15 minutes to go and the score at 1–1, as the campaign in Segunda División ended in promotion for both sides in the city. However, in 2004–05, as the team achieved a fourth place in the league, with qualification to the UEFA Champions League, he appeared in only 11 matches, mainly due to injuries.

After another two-and-a-half-month spell in the sidelines, Capi returned to action on 4 April 2009, netting as a second-half substitute in a 3–3 home draw with CD Numancia. Betis were eventually relegated to division two.

Capi continued to be bothered with injuries in the 2009–10 season, but still contributed 26 appearances – only three complete – as the club failed to regain its lost status. On 19 June 2010, the 33-year-old appeared in his last game as a Verdiblanco, the useless 4–0 home win over Levante UD (they finished in fourth place, tied with both the second and third-placed teams), his contract subsequently expiring and not being renewed.

Later career
In summer 2012, after a couple of second-tier campaigns with another side in his native region, Xerez CD, Capi signed with amateurs Camas Club de Fútbol, his first-ever club as a footballer. He retired in 2014 at age 37, being immediately appointed as Juan Merino's assistant manager at Betis B.

International career
Capi earned four caps for the Spain national team, making his debut on 27 March 2002 against the Netherlands in a 1–0 friendly loss in Rotterdam. He featured in a further three internationals the same year.

Honours
Betis
Copa del Rey: 2004–05

References

External links

1977 births
Living people
People from Camas, Seville
Sportspeople from the Province of Seville
Spanish footballers
Footballers from Andalusia
Association football midfielders
La Liga players
Segunda División players
Segunda División B players
Betis Deportivo Balompié footballers
Real Betis players
Granada CF footballers
Xerez CD footballers
Spain international footballers